Norfolk State University (NSU) is a public historically black university in Norfolk, Virginia. It is a member of the Thurgood Marshall College Fund and Virginia High-Tech Partnership.

History

The institution was founded on September 18, 1935, as the Norfolk Unit of Virginia Union University.  Eighty-five students attended the first classes held in 1935. Mr. Samuel Fischer Scott, an alumnus of Virginia Union and Portsmouth native, served as the first director with the primary focus of maintaining the solvency of the school. Dr. Lyman Beecher Brooks, a Virginia Union alumnus, succeeded Mr. Scott as director in 1938, and served as provost, 1963–1969, and the first president 1969–1975.

In 1942, the school became independent of VUU and was named Norfolk Polytechnic College.  Within two years, by an act of the Virginia Legislature, it became a part of Virginia State College (now Virginia State University).  By 1950, the 15th anniversary of the college founding, the faculty had grown to fifty and the student enrollment to 1,018. In 1952, the college's athletic teams adopted the "Spartan" name and identity.

The City of Norfolk provided a permanent site for the college on Corprew Avenue, and in 1955 Brown Hall, formerly Tidewater Hall, opened as the first permanent building on the new campus. In 1956 the future Norfolk State College granted its first bachelor's degrees.

In 1969, the college divided from Virginia State College and was named Norfolk State College. The college was issued accreditation from the Southern Association of Colleges and Schools the same year with an enrollment of 5,400 students. In 1975 and the year following, the first master's degrees were awarded in Communications and Social Work, respectively. Dr. Harrison Benjamin Wilson, Jr., in 1975, succeeded Dr. Lyman Beecher Brooks as President after 37 years.

When the college was granted university status in 1979 by the General Assembly of Virginia, it changed its name to Norfolk State University.

Norfolk State University celebrated its 50th anniversary in 1985 with a year of observances and with an enrollment of 7,200. In 1995 Norfolk State University's enrollment reached 9,112.

Upon the retirement of Dr. Harrison Benjamin Wilson in 1997, Marie Valentine McDemmond, became NSU's third President in 1997 and served until her retirement. Alvin J. Schexnider became interim president in July 2005. Carolyn Meyers was selected as the fourth President and began service on July 1, 2006. Tony Atwater was announced as the new president in 2011 becoming the fifth president and served until he was removed by the board of visitors of Norfolk State University on August 23, 2013. Sandra DeLoatch the Provost and President of Academic Affairs was named acting president effective. On September 13, 2013, Eddie N. Moore Jr. was appointed interim president of Norfolk State University and started serving in that capacity on September 23, 2013.

In December 2013, the university was placed on probation by its regional accreditor, the Southern Association of Colleges and Schools, for "financial and governance issues."  The probation was lifted two years later.

Eddie Moore Jr. became the 6th president of Norfolk State University on January 10, 2016.

Upon President Moore announcing his retirement in late September 2017 the NSU board of visitors named Dr. Melvin Stith as interim president. He assumed office on January 1, 2018. On June 24, 2019, Dr. Javaune Adams-Gaston became the 7th president of Norfolk State University after moving from her job as Senior Vice President for Student Life at The Ohio State University.

In 2020, Norfolk State received $40 million from philanthropist MacKenzie Scott. Her gift is the largest single gift in Norfolk State's history.

Academics
The Commission on Colleges of the Southern Association of Colleges and Schools has accredited Norfolk State to award associate, baccalaureate, master and doctoral degrees. Currently, Norfolk State offers three doctorate and 15 master's degrees, including master's degree programs in electronic engineering, computer science, and criminal justice. The school also offers 36 undergraduate degrees, including the only undergraduate degree in optical engineering in Virginia.

Schools
Norfolk State's undergraduate and graduate programs are divided into eight schools/colleges.
 School of Business
 School of Education
 By 2004 the university had a fast-track program for special education licensing.
 College of Liberal Arts
 College of Engineering, Science & Technology
 School of Social Work
 School of Extended Learning
 Honors College
 Graduate School

Campus

Located on the former site of the  Memorial Park Golf Course, which the city of Norfolk sold to the school for one dollar, the campus now encompasses  of land and 31 buildings.

The Joseph G. Echols Memorial Hall is a large health, physical education, and ROTC complex with a seating capacity of 7,500. Other facilities include a 30,000-seat football stadium; a television studio and radio station, an African art museum, and a multi-purpose performing arts center. Research facilities include a life sciences building with a planetarium and a materials research wing with crystal growth, organic synthesis, laser spectroscopy, and magnetic resonance equipment.

In September 2009, the New Student Center facility opened. The three story building, which includes a game room, a dining area, a new bookstore, a wellness center (work-out facility), student lounges, and administrative offices, marks the first of two major projects for NSU.

In January 2015, the construction of the New Nursing and General Classroom Building was completed and in the Fall 2017 NSU opened a new G.W.C. Brown Memorial Hall,a three-story, 154,000 square foot academic building, which houses the School of Business, College of Liberal Arts, and Mass Communication and Math Department. The building also houses the box office, costume shop, scene shop, mainstage Theater, Studio Theater, Amphitheater, as well as drama faculty offices, classrooms, meeting rooms, study areas, and student lounges. Construction of a new four-story residential facility began in 2019. Once completed, the 193,424 square feet residential facility will include a central two-story amenity space and 740 beds for first-year students.

Construction plans for a new Science Building and Physical Plant are underway. Other recent construction on the campus include the new police station (2007), the Marie V. McDemmond Center for Applied Research (2006), and the Spartan ugly Apartments (2001), and state-of-the-art Library (2012).

Student activities

The university offers organized and informal co-curricular activities including 63 student organizations, leadership workshops, intramural activities, student publications and student internships.

Athletics

Norfolk State sports teams participate in NCAA Division I (Football Championship Subdivision for all sports including football) in the Mid-Eastern Athletic Conference (MEAC). Norfolk State was formerly a member of the Eastern Intercollegiate Conference (1953–1960) and the Central Intercollegiate Athletic Association (1962–1996).

The 2011–12 Norfolk State Spartans men's basketball team won the 2012 MEAC men's basketball tournament championship which gave them the conference's automatic bid in the 2012 NCAA Men's Division I Basketball Tournament, the school's first ever appearance in the tournament. The Spartans, a 15 seed, defeated the #2 seeded Missouri Tigers in the second round, 86-84. This victory was only the fifth time in NCAA Tournament history that a 15 seed defeated a 2 seed, with the last coming in 2001 by MEAC in-state rival Hampton.

Marching band

The Spartan Legion Band was founded in 1975. The band performs at campus events and during some Norfolk State football and basketball games. They were featured performers in the Honda Battle of the Bands in 2007 and 2008. In 2018 they were featured in the official music video for the song Heavy Metal by French house act Justice.
In 2020 the band was voted HBCU Sports Band of the Year. Selected performances include, most recently the Barack Obama Presidential campaign rally in Norfolk, VA. The “Legion’s” history includes: the Philadelphia Parade commemorating the 200th anniversary of the Constitution (1987), the Mardi Gras in the Rex Parade in New Orleans, LA (2003); the MLK “Drum Major for Justice” Parade, St. Petersburg, FL (2006); the Honda Battle of the Bands Invitational Showcase (2007 and 2008); the Norfolk Grand Illumination Parade (2006 and 2007); collegiate venues in the MEAC, CIAA and Colonial Conferences, Rutgers University, University of Kentucky and Villanova University. The “Legion” is also the inaugural host of the HBCU (Historically  Black Colleges and Universities) Band Battlefest, which annually spotlights 10 HBCU Marching Bands and command performances in San Diego, CA; Bermuda and New York, NY.  The marching band was invited into the 2023 Rose Parade in Pasadena, California.

Spartan "Legion" Marching Band Sections:
Piccolos,
Clarinets,
Saxophones,
Trumpets,
Mellophones,
Euphoniums,
Trombones,
Tubas,
Percussion,
Drum Majors,
Flags/Spartan Guards,
and Dancers (Hot Ice danceline).  

The band's primary repertoire includes the following:
NSU Alma Mater, NSU Fight Song, Behold, Be Scared, Talking Out The Side Of Your Neck By Cameo, ESPN Theme, and the NSU Spirit Song.

National fraternities and sororities
All nine of the National Pan-Hellenic Council organizations currently have chapters at Norfolk State University. These organizations are:

The Council of Independent Organizations includes:

Student media

Newspaper
The Spartan Echo is the official student-produced newspaper of Norfolk State University. The paper is available in print (available twice a month) and on the web (updated daily).

WNSB (College Radio Station)

Norfolk State operates WNSB (FM) radio, which broadcasts in stereo 24 hours a day from the campus and covers all of the Hampton Roads, Virginia, area, reaching the Eastern Shore of Virginia, northeast North Carolina and the Richmond, Virginia, suburbs.

Notable faculty and staff

This list of notable faculty and staff contains current and former faculty, staff and presidents of the Norfolk State University.

Notable alumni

This is a partial list of notable alumni which includes graduates, non-graduate former students, and current students of Norfolk State University or predecessors such as Norfolk State College.

See also
 Education in Norfolk, Virginia
 List of colleges and universities which have signed the Presidents Letter
 Sports in Norfolk, Virginia

References

External links
 
 Norfolk State Athletics website

 
Historically black universities and colleges in the United States
Education in Norfolk, Virginia
Universities and colleges accredited by the Southern Association of Colleges and Schools
Public universities and colleges in Virginia
Educational institutions established in 1935
1935 establishments in Virginia
History of Norfolk, Virginia